Sankertown is a borough in Cambria County, Pennsylvania, United States. It is part of the Johnstown, Pennsylvania Metropolitan Statistical Area. The population was 675 at the 2010 census.

Geography
Sankertown is located in eastern Cambria County at  (40.470113, -78.592050).

Sankertown has a basketball court and a baseball field.

Demographics

As of the census of 2000, there were 680 people, 248 households, and 177 families residing in the borough. The population density was 2,434.4 people per square mile (937.7/km2). There were 265 housing units at an average density of 948.7 per square mile (365.4/km2). The racial makeup of the borough was 99.12% White, 0.44% African American, 0.29% Asian, and 0.15% from two or more races. Hispanic or Latino of any race were 0.29% of the population.

There were 248 households, out of which 28.2% had children under the age of 18 living with them, 54.0% were married couples living together, 12.9% had a female householder with no husband present, and 28.6% were non-families. 24.6% of all households were made up of individuals, and 8.1% had someone living alone who was 65 years of age or older. The average household size was 2.63 and the average family size was 3.06.

In the borough the population was spread out, with 21.0% under the age of 18, 9.9% from 18 to 24, 27.4% from 25 to 44, 26.5% from 45 to 64, and 15.3% who were 65 years of age or older. The median age was 40 years. For every 100 females there were 101.2 males. For every 100 females age 18 and over, there were 96.7 males.

The median income for a household in the borough was $35,208, and the median income for a family was $42,143. Males had a median income of $31,172 versus $17,333 for females. The per capita income for the borough was $13,728. About 9.2% of families and 10.6% of the population were below the poverty line, including 16.5% of those under age 18 and 10.0% of those age 65 or over.

References

Populated places established in 1906
Boroughs in Cambria County, Pennsylvania
1906 establishments in Pennsylvania